Universal Airlines was a United States airline that operated from 1966 to 1972, based at Willow Run Airport in Ypsilanti, Michigan.  A Houston,  TX-based commuter air carrier also used the Universal name during the late 1970s operating scheduled passenger service in Louisiana, Mississippi and Texas.

History
It initially grew out of Zantop Air Transport, starting with a small fleet of C-46, DC-6, DC-7, and Argosy AW650 aircraft. Over time Lockheed Electras were added to the fleet.  In 1969 Universal took delivery of DC-8 aircraft both standard and stretched versions, and leased three additional DC-8s over the next three years.  It operated a number of military contract flights.  During its heyday in 1969, Universal Airlines looked into the plausibility of obtaining the Lockheed L-500 (Civilian C-5) to carry passengers and their vehicles from coast to coast.  An actual display model of that concept was displayed in the hangar two lobby.  The airline went bankrupt in May 1972 and its assets were received by Saturn Airways.

The President and CEO of the Universal Airlines from 1967 to 1969 was M. Lamar Muse who went on to become a co-founder and President of Southwest Airlines and later co-founded his namesake airline Muse Air where he served as CEO.

Fleet

The Universal Airlines fleet consisted of the following aircraft:

 9 - Armstrong Whitworth AW.660 Argosy
 1 - Boeing 727-100
 49 - Curtiss C-46 Commando
 6 - Douglas C-47 Skytrain
 4 - Douglas DC-3
 7 - Douglas DC-4
 7 - Douglas DC-6
 21 - Douglas DC-7
 2 - Douglas DC-8-55
 5 - Douglas DC-8-61CF
 2 - Douglas DC-8-63CF
 2 - Learjet 23
 13 - Lockheed L-188 Electra

See also 
 List of defunct airlines of the United States

References

Defunct airlines of the United States
Airlines established in 1966
Airlines disestablished in 1972
Ypsilanti, Michigan
Defunct companies based in Michigan
1966 establishments in Michigan